Opium Wars is a collective term for the mid-1800s conflicts between Western powers and China including the First Opium War (1839–1842) and the Second Opium War (1856–1860).

Opium War(s) or The Opium War(s) may also refer to:
 1967 Opium War, conflict between marooned elements of the Kuomintang (Chinese Nationalist Party) and the Kingdom of Laos
 The Opium War (film), a 1997 Chinese film about the First Opium War or about the collective two wars in China
 Opium War (2008 film), a 2008 Afghan film about opium farming and conflict in modern Afghanistan